Léon-Alexandre Delhomme (20 July 1841, in Tournon-sur-Rhône, Ardèche – 1895 or 1893, in Paris) was French sculptor. He is immortalised by a statue in the cimetière du Montparnasse in Paris.

Life
He studied at the École des Beaux-Arts, in the studio of Augustin Dumont (1801–1884) and of Joseph-Hugues Fabisch.

In 1867, he was elected to the municipal council of Paris.

Works

Statue of the Republic, in the main amphitheatre of the Sorbonne (1889). She is shown as a wise woman between an urn and a lion "removing the veil of ignorance from a young Frenchman", in one of the university's least neutral sculptures (commissioned by Soitoux).
 Statue of Louis Blanc (1811–1882) in bronze, melted down during World War Two, located on Place Monge (Paris, 5th arrondissement)
 Above the entrance to the Bazar de l'Hôtel de Ville - Paris (4th arr.)
 Bust of the French doctor Stanislas Laugier (1799–1872)
 Statue Defiance known as The Gaul
 Démocrite méditant sur le siège de l'âme.
 Standing warrior (Gaul) 
 Medal of Jean-Charles Adolphe Alphand
Cast iron
Vercingetorix,
Wounded Gaul,
Joan of Arc.

Notes 

1841 births
1895 deaths
People from Tournon-sur-Rhône
19th-century French sculptors
French male sculptors
19th-century French male artists